I. P. Senthil Kumar,  I.P.S., is an Indian politician and the presiding M.L.A. of Palani Constituency in Tamil Nadu who belongs to the DMK party. He is the son of current Minister of Tamil Nadu I.Periyasamy of Attur (State Assembly Constituency) in Tamil Nadu. Senthil Kumar was born at Batlagundu on 30 October 1977.

Early life
I. P. Senthil Kumar aka IPS (fondly called by his friends and cadre) grew up in Batlagundu. He studied in Salem law college. As a young boy he was interested in shaping the society and welfare of the public so he decided to complete law and later to serve the public he came to politics. He became a member of DMK party and was given the posting of leadership to youth wing in the party because of his hardwork and intelligence. Later he became State Youth Wing Deputy Secretary of DMK party and later on he became an MLA.

Personal life
I. P. Senthil Kumar married Arul Mercy who was formerly a television celebrity. The couple has two children, Aadhavan Senthil Kumar and Oviya Meenatchi Senthil Kumar.

Appointments
Former District Youth Wing Deputy Secretary, Dindigul District (DMK PARTY)
Former State Youth Wing Deputy Secretary (DMK PARTY)
District Secretary, Dindigul (East) District (DMK PARTY)
Incumbent M.L.A. Palani Constituency

Political career

Elections contested

References

Sources
DMK man in Dindigul after a 15-year gap
DMK cadre stage protest against erratic drinking water supply
12 candidates in Dindigul, 10 in Theni file nominations
120 candidates contest in Dindigul district
http://tamilnadumlas.com/candidate.php?mlaid=12
Tamil Nadu MLA 2019 , List of Tamil Nadu MLA 2019, Tamilnadu Mlas list October 2019

Tamil Nadu politicians
People from Dindigul district
1977 births
Living people
Tamil Nadu MLAs 2016–2021

Tamil Nadu MLAs 2021–2026